The Heritage College of Osteopathic Medicine (OU-HCOM) is the medical school of Ohio University and the only osteopathic medical school in the U.S. state of Ohio. Its mission is to emphasize the practice of primary care and train physicians to serve Ohio, especially in the underserved Appalachian and urban areas of the state.

Heritage College of Osteopathic Medicine offers a single program conferring the degree Doctor of Osteopathic Medicine (D.O.), and several combined degree programs. Graduates are eligible to practice medicine in all 50 states and more than 50 countries. The college is fully accredited by the American Osteopathic Association's Commission on Osteopathic College Accreditation, and by the Institutions of Higher Education of the North Central Association of Colleges and Schools. The World Directory of Medical Schools lists the school as a US medical school along with other accredited US MD and DO programs.

History
In 1823, the board of trustees of Ohio University passed a resolution forming a committee to "take into consideration the expediency of establishing a Medical School". Early in the state's history, Athens was chosen as a suitable location. More than 150 years later, the college was established in 1975 to award the Doctor of Osteopathic Medicine (D.O.) degree, and its first class was made up of 21 graduates. The college has since expanded, and as of the 2012–2013 academic year, there were 528 students enrolled.

In 1989, John Kopchick, Ph.D., an endocrinologist and the Goll-Ohio Eminent Scholar and Professor of Molecular Biology at the Heritage College, discovered a compound that would go on to become Pegvisomant (Somavert), a growth hormone receptor antagonist used to treat acromegaly. The team's discovery awarded Kopchick and Ohio University a number of U.S. and European patents and has since been marketed by Pfizer, earning the university more than $75 million in royalties from the license.

In 1993, Barbara Ross-Lee, D.O., was appointed to the position of dean of the Heritage College of Osteopathic Medicine; she was the first African-American woman to serve as the dean of a U.S. medical school.

In 2011, the Heritage College of Osteopathic Medicine gained renown for receiving $105 million from the Osteopathic Heritage Foundations, the largest private gift ever given to Ohio University. Shortly after, the college began creating two new extension campuses, one in partnership with OhioHealth in Dublin, Ohio, and one in partnership with Cleveland Clinic in Cleveland, Ohio.

In December 2012, the college received approval from the Commission on Osteopathic College Accreditation (COCA), the accrediting agency for osteopathic medical schools, to begin recruiting students for its Central Ohio Extension Campus in Dublin, Ohio. The charter class of 50 medical students began classes in July 2014. In July 2015, the first class of 50 students are expected to begin at the Cleveland Clinic's campus at South Pointe Hospital.

Past deans
 Gerald Alden Faverman, Ph.D. — 1975–1977
 Frank Wayne Myers, D.O. — 1977–1993
 Barbara Ross-Lee, D.O. — 1993–2000
 Daniel Jon Marazon, D.O. — 2001
 John “Jack” Adolph Brose, D.O. — 2001–2012

Academics
There are two curricular tracks available to medical students during their first and second year of medical school: the Clinical Presentation Continuum (CPC) and the Patient-Centered Continuum (PCC). Students enrolled in the more traditional CPC study a curriculum organized around important symptoms and take part in extensive lectures, problem sets and panel discussions. Students in PCC spend more time in clinical and community experiences learning patient interviewing skills, with an emphasis on student-defined learning objectives.

During years three and four, students enter one of 29 available teaching hospitals within the Centers for Osteopathic Research and Education (CORE), a statewide medical education consortium founded by the college.

Several combined degree programs are available as well, including: 
 D.O./M.P.H. 
 D.O./M.H.A.
 D.O./M.B.A.
 D.O./Ph.D.

People

Alumni
 Robert Biscup, D.O. '80
 Terry Johnson (Ohio politician), D.O. '91
 Thomas Hutson, D.O. '97

Faculty and staff
 Barbara Ross-Lee

See also
 List of Medical Schools in the United States

References

External links 
 School website

Medical schools in Ohio
Osteopathic medical schools in the United States
Educational institutions established in 1975
Ohio University
1975 establishments in Ohio